In macroeconomics, the Sahm Rule, or Sahm Rule Recession Indicator, is a heuristic measure by the Federal Reserve for determining when an economy has entered a recession. It is useful in real-time evaluation of the business cycle and relies on monthly unemployment data from the Bureau of Labor Statistics (BLS). It is named eponymously after former Federal Reserve and Council of Economic Advisors economist Claudia Sahm.

Origination 
The Sahm Rule originates from a chapter in The Brooking Institute's report on the use of fiscal policy to stabilize the economy during recessions. The chapter, written by Sahm, proposes fiscal policy to automatically send stabilizing payments to citizens to boost economic well-being. Instead of relying on human intuition to determine when such payments should be sent, Sahm outlines a condition to trigger the payments. The trigger suggested indicates an economy beginning a recession and is now known as the Sahm Rule.

Implementation 
The Sahm Rule was published by The St. Louis Federal Reserve Bank's Federal Reserve Economic Data (FRED) system in October 2019. It is retroactively calculated to evaluate performance from past recessions. The recession rule is defined as:

"Sahm Recession Indicator signals the start of a recession when the three-month moving average of the national unemployment rate (U3) rises by 0.50 percentage points or more relative to its low during the previous 12 months." 

Relying on the change in unemployment from the previous 12 months means the natural rate of unemployment is seamlessly integrated. A rule relying on a fixed level of unemployment, in contrast, cannot take into account drifts caused by changes in demographics, technology, or labor market frictions. 

The rule only relies on a single data series, national unemployment, which is published monthly by the BLS. This differentiates the index from other recession indicators based on statistical models, which may rely on dozens of inputs. Further, unemployment can be more easily understood than complex financial series.

Reception 
The Sahm Rule has received recognition by popular economics news sources. Its simplicity and low rate of false positives are attractive features. 

While the Sahm rule indicates recessions sooner than the formal NBER recession indications, which can take anywhere from half to two years, it is by no means predictive. The rule triggered approximately three months into each of the last several recessions, with the beginning of the recession retroactively determined by the NBER. The long-standing inverted yield curve recession indicator is forward-looking but crippled with false positives and uncertain arrival dates.

References

External links 

 National Unemployment: Monthly BLS data

Economic indicators
Recessions
Unemployment